Gagnef Municipality (Gagnefs kommun) is a municipality in Dalarna County in central Sweden. Its seat is located in the town of Djurås with 2,257 inhabitants, with the largest town being Mockfjärd with 2365 inhabitants. The locality of Gagnef itself is a smaller village.

In 1971 "old" Gagnef was amalgamated with Floda, forming the present municipality.

The industry is dominated by small and semi-small companies mainly operating in the forest industry.

Geographically, the two rivers of the Västerdal River and the Österdal River flow together in Gagnef to form the Dal River, as represented in the municipality's coat of arms.

Localities 
 Björbo
 Bäsna
 Djurmo
 Djurås (seat)
 Floda
 Gagnef
 Mockfjärd
 Sifferbo

Riksdag elections

References

External links

Gagnef Municipality – Official site

Municipalities of Dalarna County